Paradarisa comparataria is a moth of the family Geometridae. It is found in India and Taiwan.

Subspecies
Paradarisa comparataria comparataria
Paradarisa comparataria rantaizanensis Wileman, 1911 (Taiwan)

References

Moths described in 1866
Boarmiini